Olorunyomi Oloruntimilehin (born 13 August 1999) professionally known as Bad Boy Timz is a Nigerian singer and songwriter. He rose to prominence with the release of the song "MJ," and a follow-up remix which featured Nigeria singer Mayorkun.

He was also featured in Olamide's hit single titled Loading off Carpe Diem winning the Rookie of the Year at The Headies 2020.

Early life and career 
In 2019, Bad Boy Timz skits and freestyles for which he received shoutouts from industry giants (including J Hus) caught the eye of the record label, and early in 2019, he signed a deal with Anonymous Record label.

In 2020, Bad Boy Timz graduated from the Bells University of Technology with a degree in Computer Engineering.

Record label dispute

On 24 May, Bad Boy Timz took to social media to share a scanned copy of a complaint he filed against his previous record label, Anonymous Music.

According to the legal document, disputes occurred between the two parties after that his old label instigated his wrongful detention and that a video of the incident was taken and opted to cancel his contract with the record company due to the label's "breach of contract terms."

Bad Boy Timz said that his old label instigated his wrongful detention and that a video of the incident was taken, He founded the Shock Absorbers Music record label in May 2021 and also a distribution deal with Empire label.

Discography

EP
Timz EP

Singles

As Featured

Awards and nominations

References

1999 births
Living people
21st-century Nigerian male singers